HMAS Burdekin (K376) was a  that served the Royal Australian Navy (RAN) from 1944 to 1946. She was named for the Burdekin River in Queensland and was one of twelve River-class frigates built for the RAN during World War II.

Construction
Burdekin was launched at Walkers Limited, Maryborough on 30 June 1943 and commissioned on 27 June 1944. Her patron was K. Collings, daughter of Senator Joe Collings, Minister for the Interior and Leader of the Government in the Senate.

Operational history

World War II
Burdekin was posted to New Guinean waters in October 1944. From November 1944 to May 1945, she escorted convoys travelling between New Guinea and the Philippines. In May 1945, she supported the Australian landing at Tarakan and carried out surveillance operations in the Borneo and Celebes areas.

The frigate was awarded the battle honours "Pacific 1944–45" and "Bornero 1945" for her wartime service.

Post-war
After a refit in Sydney, Burdekin operated in the Netherlands East Indies following the end of the war. The Japanese surrender of Dutch Borneo was accepted on board the ship by Major General Milford of the 7th Australian Division, on 8 September 1945 and the ship later participated in occupation duties off Borneo and Macassar.

Decommissioning and fate
HMAS Burdekin returned to Australia in January 1946 and was paid off from the RAN and placed in reserve on 18 April 1946.

She was declared for disposal on 9 November 1960 and sold for scrap to the Tolo Mining and Smelting Company of Hong Kong on 21 September 1961.

References

 Sea Power Centre – Australia HMAS Burdekin ship history

River-class frigates of the Royal Australian Navy
Ships built in Queensland
1943 ships